In enzymology, an alliin lyase is an enzyme that catalyzes the chemical reaction

an S-alkyl-L-cysteine S-oxide  an alkyl sulfenate + 2-aminoacrylate

Hence, this enzyme has one substrate, S-alkyl-L-cysteine S-oxide, and two products, alkyl sulfenate and 2-aminoacrylate.

This enzyme belongs to the family of lyases, specifically the class of carbon-sulfur lyases.  The systematic name of this enzyme class is S-alkyl-L-cysteine S-oxide alkyl-sulfenate-lyase (2-aminoacrylate-forming). Other names in common use include alliinase, cysteine sulfoxide lyase, alkylcysteine sulfoxide lyase, S-alkylcysteine sulfoxide lyase, L-cysteine sulfoxide lyase, S-alkyl-L-cysteine sulfoxide lyase, and alliin alkyl-sulfenate-lyase.  It employs one cofactor, pyridoxal phosphate.

Many alliinases contain a novel N-terminal epidermal growth factor-like domain (EGF-like domain).

Occurrence 
These enzymes are found in plants of the genus Allium, such as garlic and onions. Alliinase is responsible for catalyzing chemical reactions that produce the volatile chemicals that give these foods their flavors, odors, and tear-inducing properties. Alliinases are part of the plant's defense against herbivores. Alliinase is normally sequestered within a plant cell, but, when the plant is damaged by a feeding animal, the alliinase is released to catalyze the production of the pungent chemicals. This tends to have a deterrent effect on the animal. The same reaction occurs when onion or garlic is cut with a knife in the kitchen.

Chemistry 
In garlic, an alliinase enzyme acts on the chemical alliin converting it into allicin. The process involves two stages: elimination of 2-propenesulfenic acid from the amino acid unit (with α-aminoacrylic acid as a byproduct), and then condensation of two of the sulfenic acid molecules.

Alliin and related substrates found in nature are chiral at the sulfoxide position (usually having the S absolute configuration, and alliin itself was the first natural product found to have both carbon- and sulfur-centered stereochemistry. However, the sulfenic acid intermediate is not chiral, and the final product's stereochemistry is not controlled.

There are a range of similar enzymes that can react with the cysteine-derived sulfoxides present in different species. In onions, an isomer of alliin, isoalliin, is converted to 1-propenesulfenic acid. A separate enzyme, the lachrymatory factor synthase or LFS, then converts this chemical to syn-propanethial-S-oxide, a potent lachrymator. The analogous butyl compound, syn-butanethial-S-oxide, is found in Allium siculum species.

Structural studies
As of late 2007, 3 structures have been solved for this class of enzymes, using X-ray crystallography.

References

Bibliography

External links 
 Genuine Garlic:Alliinase from Allium sativum.

EC 4.4.1
Enzymes of known structure
Pyridoxal phosphate enzymes